The Atlantic white-sided dolphin (Lagenorhynchus acutus) is a distinctively coloured dolphin found in the cool to temperate waters of the North Atlantic Ocean.

Description

The dolphin is slightly larger than most other oceanic dolphins. It weighs 180–230 kg (400- 510 lb) once fully-grown. Females reach sexual maturity at between 6 and 12 years, and males between 7 and 11 years. The gestation period is 11 months and lactation lasts for about 18 months — both typical figures for dolphins. Individuals are known to live for at least 17 years.

The key distinguishing feature is the white to pale yellow patch found behind the dorsal fin of the dolphin on each side. This colour variation is unique amongst the mixtures of white, greys and blues of other pelagic cetaceans. The rest of the body's coloration is well demarcated: the chin, throat and belly are white; the flippers, dorsal fin and back are dark grey to black with the exception of the yellow patch; there is a further white patch below the dorsal fin, lying above a light grey stripe that runs from the beak, above the eye and down to the tail stock.

Dolphin group sizes vary by location, with groups averaging 60 in number close to the Newfoundland shores, but rather smaller east of Iceland. From the analysis of the stomach contents of stranded animals, fish such as herring and mackerel and squid appear to form the species' main diet. The Atlantic white-sided dolphin is fairly acrobatic and keen to interact with boats, however it is not as wildly gregarious as the white-beaked and common dolphins.

Geographic range and distribution 
The species is endemic to the North Atlantic Ocean. The distribution limits are Norwegian sea in the north east; Davis Strait in the north west; North Carolina in the south west and Celtic Sea in the south east (possible range extension to the Azores). Areas of particularly high population density include the shores of Newfoundland and Cape Cod, the triangular area of sea between the United Kingdom, Iceland and Greenland and the North Sea. In 2008, sightings of Atlantic white-sided dolphins as well as the melon-headed whale were documented in South Carolina after a few stranding had taken place in the area at the time. The species tends to occur in continental shelf waters, around 100m depth. They show preference toward areas with steep slopes and canyons. They are more likely to be observed in cold, less saline waters but it is unclear whether it is due to preference or if these factors influence prey distribution.

Behaviour

Foraging 
The diet of Atlantic white-sided dolphins includes mainly herring, hake and squid. However, they consume a large variety of prey including small mackerel and various bottom fish. They have been observed to cooperatively hunt on the surface. It has been suggested that larger groups split while feeding.

Social Behaviour 
Like all species of the dolphin family, Atlantic white-sided dolphins are very social animals. Often traveling in large pods and displaying aerial behaviors as they travel. The group size varies from several dozen to several hundreds individuals with average size around 50. However, there seems to be little relatedness between the members of the group. Studies in different parts of the distribution range found that individuals were mainly unrelated to each other. Juveniles spend at least some time in separate groups than adults. Atlantic white-sided dolphins jump and breach more frequently when in larger groups thus this behaviour might have a social context. They have a wide vocal repertoire which includes squeals, whistles, clicks and buzzes. It is suggested that vocalisation is used for communication as noise production increases during socialising.

Despite being docile creatures, even known to interact with various species of cetacean in a nonviolent manner, most notably with the long-finned pilot whale (Globicephala melas), they have also been known to display violent behavior towards harbor porpoises, attacking them until they eventually succumb to their wounds, a similar behavior observed in bottlenose dolphins.

Migration 
Atlantic white-sided dolphins do not undertake specific seasonal migration. However, they do move within their home range following prey distribution. For example, in the waters off eastern North America this species moves southwards in winter and spring.

Reproduction 
Most of the calves are born around June and July. The gestation period is 11 months and lactation around 18 months. The birth interval varies between 1–3 years.

Females reach sexual maturity around the age of 6–12 years. Males reach sexual maturity around 7–11 years. The reproduction is most likely seasonal, beginning in February, as some studies have identified dormant testes in some males.

Taxonomy 
The Atlantic white-sided dolphin was named by John Edward Gray in 1828. The specific name acutus comes from the Latin for 'pointed' and refers to the sharply pointed dorsal fin. It is traditionally placed in the genus Lagenorhynchus, but there is consistent molecular evidence that supports the Atlantic white-sided dolphin and the white-beaked dolphin as basal members of the family Delphinidae and not closely related. It has therefore been proposed to move the Atlantic white-sided dolphin to its own genus, Leucopleurus.

Population status
The estimations for the U.S. shelf and shelf-edge water suggest that the population size is about 300,000. Additional 120,000 individuals have been estimated to spend summer in the Gulf of St.Lawrence. In the eastern North America waters the numbers increase southwards in winter and spring in association with cold waters from the Gulf of Maine. Two projects attempted to estimate the population trends - multinational Small Cetacean Abundance in the North Sea and Adjacent Waters (SCANS) survey project and the North Atlantic Sightings Survey (NASS). SCANS surveys, however, failed to produce species specific estimation as it combined both white-sided and white-beaked dolphins. NASS surveys did not indicate any population trends.

Threats

Whaling 
Historically, Atlantic white-sided dolphins were killed in drives conducted from Norway and Newfoundland. These have ceased in recent years, although they still occur to a lesser extent from the Faroe Islands, where the meat and blubber are in high regard as food. Reported catches in the years vary, though individual years suddenly stand out, such as in 2002, where the number reported killed was 773, and in 2017, when 488 were killed. In September 2021, a large pod of 1,428 animals was herded in Skálafjördur and killed.

Entanglement and by catch 
Atlantic white-sided dolphins have also been killed in incidental catch situations in the fishing industry. Such occurrences have been reported in Canada, United States, United Kingdom and Ireland. Between 1977 and 1988, 13 Atlantic white-sided dolphins were reported as being incidentally caught in the Northeastern United States by U.S fisheries observers, 11 of these in Mackerel fisheries. They have also been reported to get caught  in pelagic or near surface trawl or drift nets.

Noise 
Anthropogenic underwater noise is a potential disturbance to Atlantic white-sided dolphins as they use sounds to communicate and catch prey. A survey done in the UK showed that the sighting rate of Atlantic white-sided dolphins declines when airguns were firing compared to when they were not.

Pollution 
Persistent organic pollutants (POPs) such as PCBs and organochlorine pesticides (e.g. DDT, DDE) and polybrominated diphenyl ether (PBDE) flame retardants have been identified in body tissues of Atlantic white-sided dolphins throughout their range. Males had higher levels of PCBs suggesting that females pass some of the contamination to offspring during lactation[30]. Similarly to other species, studies have identified heavy metals in Atlantic white-sided dolphins including cadmium levels higher than in other dolphin species in southern latitudes. The full effect of this contamination is currently unknown.

Conservation status
The International Union of the Conservation of Nature (IUCN) currently classifies Atlantic white-sided dolphins as Least Concern.

The North and Baltic Sea populations of the Atlantic white-sided dolphin are listed on Appendix II  of the Convention on the Conservation of Migratory Species of Wild Animals (CMS). They are listed on Appendix II as they have an unfavourable conservation status or would benefit significantly from international co-operation organised by tailored agreements. These species of dolphin are known to fall victims to in a polluted environment, a study from 1997 confirmed that the British and Irish populations of Atlantic white-sided dolphins to succumb to these effects.

In addition, the Atlantic white-sided dolphin is covered by the Agreement on the Conservation of Small Cetaceans of the Baltic, North East Atlantic, Irish and North Seas (ASCOBANS).

See also

List of cetaceans
Marine biology

References

Atlantic white-sided Dolphin by Frank Cipriano, Encyclopedia of Marine Mammals pp49–51 
National Audubon Society: Guide to Marine Mammals of the World 
Encyclopedia of Marine Mammals

External links
Atlantic white-sided dolphin at ARKive



Cetaceans of Europe
Cetaceans of the Atlantic Ocean
Cetaceans of the Arctic Ocean
Fauna of the British Isles
Atlantic white-sided dolphin
Atlantic white-sided dolphin
Lagenorhynchus